Vinius is a genus of skipper butterflies in the family Hesperiidae.

Species
The following species are recognised in the genus Vinius:
 Vinius letis (Plötz, 1883)
 Vinius pulcherrimus Hayward, 1934
 Vinius tryhana (Kaye, 1914)

References

Natural History Museum Lepidoptera genus database

Hesperiidae
Hesperiidae genera